Vivek Raj Wangkhem (died 17 May 2021) was an Indian politician. He was elected to the Manipur Legislative Assembly from Kshetrigao Assembly constituency in 2002 as a member of the Manipur State Congress Party and served till 2007.

He later served as the General Secretary of the National People's Party. Wangkhem died from COVID-19 on 17 May 2021, aged 47.

References

1970s births
2021 deaths
Manipur MLAs 2002–2007
Manipur State Congress Party politicians
Manipur Peoples Party politicians
National People's Party (India) politicians
People from Imphal East district
Deaths from the COVID-19 pandemic in India